The 1968 Intertoto Cup was the second, following the previous year's in which no knock-out rounds were contested, and therefore the second in which no winner was declared. The tournament was expanded, with 50 clubs and fourteen groups compared to 48 clubs and twelve groups the season before. Clubs from Portugal and Spain participated for the first time.

Group stage
The teams were divided into fourteen groups - of four clubs each in the 'A' section, and of six clubs each in the 'B' section. Clubs from Belgium, France, Italy, the Netherlands, Spain and Portugal were placed in 'A'; while clubs from East Germany, Poland, Sweden and Denmark were placed in 'B' groups. Clubs from West Germany, Austria, Czechoslovakia and Switzerland were placed in both sections.

Group A1

Group A2

Group A3

Note: Match between Dukla Prague and Rapid Vienna was not played.

Group A4

Group A5

Group A6

Group B1

Group B2

Group B3

Group B4

Group B5

Group B6

Group B7

Group B8

See also
 1968–69 European Cup
 1968–69 UEFA Cup Winners' Cup
 1968–69 Inter-Cities Fairs Cup

External links
  by Pawel Mogielnicki

1968
4